Megan LeCrone is an American ballet dancer and soloist with the New York City Ballet.

Early life and training 
LeCrone was born in Winston-Salem, North Carolina to Jonathan and Sandra LeCrone and raised in Greensboro. She has two sisters, Emery LeCrone, a ballet dancer and choreographer, and Alexandra, an English teacher. LeCrone began her dance training when she was four years old at the School of Greensboro Ballet under the direction of Maryhelen Mayfield, John Dennis, and Elissa Fuchs. When she was fourteen years old she began training with Melissa Hayden and Duncan Noble at the North Carolina School of the Arts in Winston-Salem.

Career
LaCrone performed choreography by Cecilia Bengolea, featuring the song “Geneva” by British musician Kindness. Using 3D scanners, the performance was made into an interactive viewing experience with layers of raw data that can be switched by the viewer.

LeCrone, along with six other dancers from the New York City Ballet, opened the Spring 2016 New York Fashion Week in a performance choreographed by Justin Peck.

In 2012 she was featured in a film short titled Figure Studies, and was later featured in a documentary series on the New York City Ballet in 2016. She was featured in the online fashion magazine StyleLikeU.

New York City Ballet 
In early fall of 2001, she entered the School of American Ballet and in November 2001 she became an apprentice with the New York City Ballet. In October 2002 she joined the company as member of the corps de ballet. She was on medical leave from the company for various injuries for seven years before she was promoted to the rank of soloist in February 2013. In 2012 she danced the role of Dewdrop in The Nutcracker. In 2015, LeCrone made her debut as the Sugar Plum Fairy in The Nutcracker. Notable performances include principal roles in Balanchine's Agon,  Raymonda Variations, the opening Symphony in Episodes,  Rubies from Jewels, and many other prominent and leading roles with the New York City Ballet.

References

Year of birth missing (living people)
Living people
21st-century American ballet dancers
New York City Ballet soloists
American ballerinas
People from Greensboro, North Carolina
People from Winston-Salem, North Carolina
School of American Ballet alumni
University of North Carolina School of the Arts alumni
Dancers from North Carolina